Wahidi is a former sultanate in South Arabia, now part of Yemen.  In the 19th century it was subdivided into several sultanates.  These included:

Wahidi Balhaf (known from 1962–1967 simply as Wahidi)
Wahidi Azzan
Wahidi Bir Ali
Wahidi Haban

Former countries in the Middle East
History of Yemen